Senator Fields may refer to:

Cleo Fields (born 1962), Louisiana State Senate
Eddie Fields (born 1967), Oklahoma State Senate
Harvey Fields (politician) (1882–1961), Louisiana State Senate
Rhonda Fields (fl. 2000s–2010s), Colorado State Senate
Thomas C. Fields (1825–1885), New York State Senate

See also
Senator Field (disambiguation)